The 2014 Codasur South American Rally Championship was an international rally championship sanctioned by the FIA and run by the Confederacion Deportiva Automovilismo Sudamericana (Codasur). The championship was contested over five events held in five South American countries from April to November. 2014 saw an Argentine event restored to the calendar after it was dropped from the 2013 calendar. The season had an earlier start in April with Rally Trans Itapua and Rally de Erechim swapping places in the calendar with the returning Rally Argentina slotting in between the two.

The championship was won by Paraguay's Diego Domínguez, after he won the season's first three events. Domínguez won the championship by 28 points ahead of compatriot Gustavo Saba, and Bolivia's Eduardo Peredo. Saba had the better results in a tie-break with Peredo, having won the final event of the season, the Rally de Minas. The season's only other winner, Miguel Zaldivar, finished in fourth place in the drivers' championship, having finished as the best Codasur runner in the Rally de Santa Cruz.

Event calendar and results
The 2014 Codasur South American Rally Championship was as follows:

Championship standings
The 2014 Codasur South American Rally Championship points were as follows:

References

External links

Codasur South American Rally Championship
Codasur South America
Codasur South American Rally Championship